The National Museum of Iran is located in Tehran, Iran. It is an institution formed of two complexes; the Museum of Ancient Iran and the Museum of Islamic Archaeology and Art of Iran, which were opened in 1937 and 1972, respectively.

The institution hosts historical monuments dating back through preserved ancient and medieval Iranian antiquities, including pottery vessels, metal objects, textile remains, and some rare books and coins. It also includes a number of research departments, categorized by different historical periods and archaeological topics.

History

The brick building of the Museum of Ancient Iran was designed by French architects André Godard and Maxime Siroux in the early 20th century, and was influenced by Sassanian vaults, particularly the Taq Kasra at Ctesiphon. It was then officially inaugurated in 1937.

The Museum of the Islamic Era was later built with white travertine on the grassy grounds of the Museum of Ancient Iran. Firouz Bagherzadeh, director of the Iranian Center for Archaeological Research, hold a series of symposiums on Iranian archaeology in this building. It has gone through quite a few hasty interior changes, and was still being remodeled when the 1979 Revolution swept the country.
 

While the Museum of Ancient Iran always had a clear mandate to show archaeological relics, as well as some rare medieval textiles and rug pieces, the newer complex began to also feature the exquisite Amlash pottery from prehistoric Caspian Sea regions of Iran. This followed some modern works, and the repeated gutting and remodeling of the interior.

The Museum of Ancient Iran consists of two floors. Its halls contain artifacts and fossils from the Lower, Middle, and Upper Paleolithic, as well as the Neolithic, Chalcolithic, early and late Bronze Age, and Iron Ages I-III, through the Median, Achaemenid, Seleucid, Parthian, and Sassanian eras.

The newer complex consists of three floors. It contains various pieces of pottery, textiles, texts, artworks, astrolabes, and adobe calligraphy, from Iran's post-classical era.

Ancient Iran Museum
The permanent exhibition covers a surface area of some 4,800 square meters on two floors and a basement, containing selected artifacts in chronological order, from the Lower Paleolithic period (ca. 1,000,000 years ago) to the end of Sasanian times (651 CE). The first-floor galleries contain prehistoric objects including Paleolithic, Epipaleolithic, Neolithic, and Chalcolithic artifacts. The ground floor galleries contain historic objects including Bronze Age, Elamite, Iron Age, Median, Achaemenid, Seleucid, Parthian, and Sassanian artifacts

The oldest artifacts kept at the museum are from Kashafrud, Darband, and  Shiwatoo, which date back to the Lower Paleolithic period. Mousterian stone tools made by Neanderthals are also on display at the first hall of the Museum of Ancient Iran. The most important Upper Paleolithic tools are from Yafteh, dating back about 30,000 to 35,000 years. 
The Paleolithic personal ornaments, clay, and human figurines from the early village communities such as 9,000-year-old human and animal figurines from Sarab mound in Kermanshah, the earliest evidence of administrative technology and writing from the 4th millennium BC, Persepolis stone reliefs and capitals, Parthian life-size bronze statue of the "Shami Man", the natural mummy of a man called "Salt Man", are among the important objects in the museum.

Islamic Archaeology and Art of Iran
The Museum of Islamic Archaeology and Art of Iran covers some 4000 square meters with three floors is a part of the National Museum of Iran. Its octagonal plan is inspired by the Sasanid palace at Bishāpur. The museum building was designed by architect Eugene Aftandilian, and its construction began in the 1940s and was completed in the 1950s. The building was initially used as an ethnography museum and for temporary exhibitions. After a period of renovation, the building was reopened in 1996 as the Museum of the Islamic Era. In the summer of 2006, another phase of restoration and reconstruction began, and the new museum was reopened in 2015.
The ground floor is designated as the auditorium and the temporary exhibitions hall. The Islamic artifacts are on display chronologically on the first and second floors. The second floor contains the early Islamic, Seljuq, and Ilkhanid periods and the first floor houses the holy Qurān hall, and artifacts of the Timurid, Safavid, Afshār, Zand and Qajar periods.

Exhibitions
The ground floor of the newer complex has been dedicated to contemporary exhibitions. Temporary exhibition galleries are featured two or three times annually and usually run for about one to two months. One of the most successful exhibitions, entitled Evidence for Two Hundred Thousand Years of Human-Animal Bonds in Iran, ran from August to October 2014. The exhibition was mainly about the relation and coexistence of past human societies and various animal species in Iran, since the late Lower Paleolithic to modern decades.

Departments

Gallery

See also

Reza Abbasi Museum
Tehran Museum of Contemporary Art
List of museums in Iran

References

External links

  Official website of Iran National Museum
 Official website of Journal of Iran National Museum 
 Photo Gallery of the National Museum of Iran
 Virtual Tour of Iran National Museum 1  
 Virtual Tour of Iran National Museum 2 

Museums in Iran
Museums established in 1937
Museums in Tehran
Cultural infrastructure completed in 1937

Architecture in Iran
Museums of Ancient Near East in Asia
Islamic museums
Archaeological museums in Iran